The Rhymney Railway S class was a class of 0-6-0T steam locomotives introduced into traffic in 1908 designed by the railway's engineer Hurry Riches. There were initially four locos in the class. A further 4 ‘S1’ locomotives with a larger boiler and higher tractive effort were built in 1920.

References

External links 

 Rail UK database entry for Rhymney Railway S class
 Rail UK database entry for Rhymney Railway S1 class

R Class
0-6-0T locomotives
Railway locomotives introduced in 1908
Scrapped locomotives
Standard gauge steam locomotives of Great Britain
Freight locomotives